Ahmed Saif (Arabic:أحمد سيف) (born 14 May 1991) is an Emirati footballer who plays as a left back.

Career

youth career
Ahmed Saif started his career at Dubai and is a product of the Dubai's youth system, and joined the youth Al-Sharjah in 2008.

Al-Shaab
In 2013 he signed with Al-Shaab. On 17 January 2014, Ahmed Saif made his professional debut for Al-Shaab against Al-Nasr in the Pro League, replacing Badr Belal.

Al-Sharjah
He was playing with Al-Shaab and after merging Al-Sharjah, and Al-Shaab clubs under the name Al-Sharjah he was joined to Al-Sharjah. On 20 September 2018, Ahmed Saif made his professional debut for Al-Sharjah against Shabab Al-Ahli in the Pro League, replacing Al Hassan Saleh. On 17 February 2019, Ahmed Saif was injured during the Al-Sharjah and Al-Nasr match in the UAE Pro League and his team was forced to complete the match with 10 players after the three changes were exhausted.

External links

References

1991 births
Living people
Emirati footballers
Dubai CSC players
Sharjah FC players
Al-Shaab CSC players
UAE Pro League players
UAE First Division League players
Association football fullbacks
Place of birth missing (living people)